Daphne Palasi Andreades is an American writer, whose debut novel Brown Girls was published in 2022.

Born and raised in Queens, she is a graduate of the MFA creative writing program at Columbia University. Brown Girls, a novel about a group of multicultural young girls growing up in immigrant families in New York City, was published by Random House in 2022.

The novel was shortlisted for the 2022 Center for Fiction First Novel Prize, and longlisted for the inaugural Carol Shields Prize for Fiction in 2023.

References

External links

21st-century American novelists
21st-century American women writers
American women novelists
American writers of Asian descent
Writers from Queens, New York
Living people